The 1983 Australian Rally Championship was a series of four rallying events held across Australia. It was the 16th season in the history of the competition.

Ross Dunkerton won the 1983 Drivers Championship and Geoff Jones took out the navigators honours for the year.

Season review
The 16th Australian Rally Championship was held over four events across Australia, the season consisting of one event each for Queensland, Victoria, New South Wales and Western Australia.  With the series being reduced to four events for the year, the field split between two categories with the introduction of Group A cars and the lack of any factory backed teams, things did not look promising.  This was compounded when the second round in Queensland was postponed twice due to inclement weather.  However it was an interesting and hard fought season with Dunkerton taking out his fifth title and using three different cars and two navigators to do so.  The navigator's title went to Geoff Jones who was with runner up to the driver's title Peter Johnson for all four events.

The Rallies
The five events of the 1983 season were as follows.

Round One – The Sunday Times Safari

Group A

Round Two – The James Hardie National Rally

Group A

Round Three – The Dunlop 2GO Rally

Group A

Round Four – The Enka-Fill Alpine Rally

1983 Drivers and Navigators Championships
Final pointscore for 1983 is as follows.

Ross Dunkerton – Champion Driver 1983

Geoff Jones – Champion Navigator 1983

References

External links
  Results of Snowy Mountains Rally and ARC results.

Rally Championship
Rally competitions in Australia
1983 in rallying